Fuscoscypha is a genus of fungi within the Hyaloscyphaceae family. This is a monotypic genus, containing the single species Fuscoscypha acicularum.

References

External links
Index Fungorum

Hyaloscyphaceae
Monotypic Leotiomycetes genera